Oliver Springs is a town in Anderson, Morgan, and Roane counties in the U.S. state of Tennessee. Its population was 3,231 at the 2010 census. It is included in the Harriman, Tennessee Micropolitan Statistical Area, which consists of Roane County.

History

Oliver Springs was founded in 1821 as Winter's Gap. It was named for its first permanent settler of European descent, Major Moses Winters, who had settled in the area before 1799.

Before that time, the area around Oliver Springs had been used by Native Americans as a hunting ground and campsite. Natural mineral springs and abundant wildlife on Windrock Mountain encouraged Native Americans to stay. The springs, whose reputation for miraculous medicinal properties lasted until the 20th century, were called Tah-hah-lehaha, which meant "healing waters" in the Cherokee language.

The land remained unexplored by European settlers until 1761. At this time, a long hunting expedition led by Elisha Walden explored much of the Clinch and Powell River valleys. However, settlement in the area did not begin in earnest until the 1790s, and growth remained slow.

In 1826, Richard Oliver became the town's first postmaster. The town was renamed Oliver's Springs in his honor. The town's name was briefly changed to Poplar Springs, and then to Oliver Springs. Oliver provided mail service from his 35-room mansion, which also served as an inn. He was the first to develop the commercial potential of the mineral springs. He would transport his guests between the springs and the inn. During the Civil War, the inn was used as a hospital by both sides.

Joseph Richards bought Oliver's land in 1873. He built the first resort hotel, and in 1894 replaced this first structure with a 150-room hotel with then-modern amenities. Oliver Springs became a popular resort town. The Oliver Springs Hotel catered to wealthy guests, who came from all over the U.S. and Europe to drink the waters and bathe in the springs. In 1888, the railroad came to Oliver Springs and brought thousands of visitors to the springs.

The hotel burned in 1905. The town decided to cover the springs rather than rebuild the hotel. Evidence of water conduits and reservoirs can still be seen on the site.

Oliver Springs had a base camp during the Coal Creek War in the 1890s.

In the early part of the 20th-century, the area became dependent on the coal industry. According to historian Keith Glass, the Windrock Coal and Coke Company, a subsidiary of the Bessemer Coal, Iron and Land Company of Birmingham, began operating a coal mine near Oliver Springs circa 1904.

In 1942, during World War II, the U.S. government bought up the neighboring communities of Robertsville, Edgemoor, East Fork, Elza, Bethel, Scarborough, and Wheat and built the secret city of Oak Ridge as part of the Manhattan Project. During this period, one of the most prominent buildings in Oliver Springs — the Dr. Fred Stone Sr., Hospital — was built by Dr. Fred Stone, who worked as a physician and examiner for new Manhattan Project employees. Eventually, the economy of Oliver Springs became dependent on government employment in Oak Ridge, and suffered when employment levels declined at the end of the Cold War in the early 1990s.

In the years following the end of the Cold War, Oliver Springs and its neighbors have struggled to re-establish a solid foundation on which to base their economies. Oliver Springs has experimented with several industries. In the late 1990s, the movie October Sky was filmed in nearby coal mining areas as well as the city's downtown area. Currently, the local economy is beginning to take advantage of the mountains, which are very popular among all-terrain vehicle (ATV) riders.

Geography
Oliver Springs is located at  (36.038060, −84.336891).

The town lies at the northwestern boundary between the Ridge-and-Valley Appalachians and the Cumberland Plateau. Walden Ridge, which marks the boundary between these two physiographic provinces, is visible just beyond the immediate hill tops. The Crab Orchard Mountains, which comprise the southern extreme of the Cumberland Mountains, rise atop the Cumberland Plateau just west of Oliver Springs.

Demographics

2020 census

As of the 2020 United States census, there were 3,297 people, 1,616 households, and 1,046 families residing in the town.

2000 census
As of the census of 2000, there were 3,303 people, 1,369 households, and 958 families residing in the town. The population density was 642.0 people per square mile (247.6/km2). There were 1,459 housing units at an average density of 283.6 per square mile (109.4/km2). The racial makeup of the town was 94.85% White, 3.48% African American, 0.30% Native American, 0.12% Asian, 0.03% Pacific Islander, 0.06% from other races, and 1.15% from two or more races. Hispanic or Latino of any race were 0.36% of the population.

There were 1,369 households, out of which 28.9% had children under the age of 18 living with them, 53.2% were married couples living together, 12.9% had a female householder with no husband present, and 30.0% were non-families. 27.0% of all households were made up of individuals, and 13.3% had someone living alone who was 65 years of age or older.  The average household size was 2.41 and the average family size was 2.93.

In the town, the population was spread out, with 23.2% under the age of 18, 8.1% from 18 to 24, 27.9% from 25 to 44, 24.5% from 45 to 64, and 16.3% who were 65 years of age or older.  The median age was 39 years. For every 100 females, there were 87.1 males.  For every 100 females age 18 and over, there were 86.0 males.

The median income for a household in the town was $32,620, and the median income for a family was $39,066. Males had a median income of $28,233 versus $22,500 for females. The per capita income for the town was $15,818.  About 10.9% of families and 15.1% of the population were below the poverty line, including 13.7% of those under age 18 and 22.5% of those age 65 or over.

Education
The city of Oliver Springs is served by the school systems of the three counties among which the city is divided.

Anderson County:
Norwood Elementary School (K-5)
Norwood Middle School (6–8)
Clinton High School (9–12)
Morgan County
Coalfield School (K-12)
Roane County:
Dyllis Springs Elementary School (K-5)
Oliver Springs Middle School (6–8)
Oliver Springs High School (9–12)

The recently restored Oliver Springs Railroad Depot, built in 1896 by the Southern Railway, now houses the Oliver Springs Public Library. In addition to the traditional book holdings, the library is home to the city's historical archives, originally collected by Snyder E. Roberts.

References

External links

Town of Oliver Springs official website
 Oliver Springs Historical Society
 Oliver Springs High School
 Coal Creek OHV Area
 Windrock ATV Club

Towns in Anderson County, Tennessee
Towns in Morgan County, Tennessee
Towns in Roane County, Tennessee
Towns in Tennessee
Knoxville metropolitan area
Populated places established in 1830
1830 establishments in Tennessee